The Cabinet Secretary for Finance and the Economy, commonly referred to as the Finance Secretary, is a member of the Cabinet in the Scottish Government. The Cabinet Secretary has Ministerial responsibility for the Scottish Government's Finance Directorates.

The finance secretary is supported by the Minister for Just Transition, Employment and Fair Work, Minister for Business, Trade, Tourism and Enterprise and Minister for Public Finance, Planning and Community Wealth.

The post is currently held by Kate Forbes who replaced Derek Mackay on 17 February 2020. She is the first woman to hold the position of office and was the first woman to deliver the Scottish budget.

History
Following devolution in 1999, the Government of First Minister Donald Dewar instituted the position as the Minister for Finance, which was renamed the Minister for Finance and Local Government in the Government of Henry McLeish from 2000 to 2001. In the first Government of Jack McConnell, from 2001 to 2003, the position was renamed as the Minister for Finance and Public Services, changed to the Minister for Finance and Public Service Reform after a reshuffle of the Second McConnell government in 2004. The first Government of Alex Salmond in 2007 combined the Minister for Finance element, with that of Enterprise and Transport to create the Cabinet Secretary for Finance and Sustainable Growth. After the 2011 election the position was named Cabinet Secretary for Finance, Employment and Sustainable Growth and the transport portfolio was moved under the remit of another Cabinet position. In November 2014, the first Sturgeon government renamed the position to Cabinet Secretary for Finance, Constitution and Economy, and in 2016 it was again renamed to Cabinet Secretary for Finance and the Constitution. It was further renamed to Finance, Economy and Fair Work in June 2018, taking some additional responsibilities from the position of Cabinet Secretary for Economy, Jobs and Fair Work which was abolished, but losing some constitutional responsibilities to the Cabinet Secretary for Government Business and Constitutional Relations. The title was shortened to simply Cabinet Secretary for Finance in February 2020, with the responsibilities of the former Economy Secretary separated again and transferred over to the Cabinet Secretary for Economy, Fair Work and Culture. The economic responsibilities of the Cabinet Secretary for Economy, Fair Work and Culture were again combined with those of the Cabinet Secretary for Finance on 19 May 2021 in the position of Cabinet Secretary for Finance and the Economy.

Overview

Responsibilities
The responsibilities of the Cabinet Secretary for Finance and the Economy include:

Scottish budget
public finances
fiscal policy and taxation
economic strategy
wellbeing economy
trade and inward investment
city and regional growth deals
enterprise
digital economy
planning
tourism
trades unions
government procurement
local government finance
public bodies policy
public sector pay

Public bodies
The following public bodies report to the Cabinet Secretary for Finance and the Economy:
 Registers of Scotland
 Revenue Scotland
 Scottish Development International
 Scottish Enterprise
 Scottish Fiscal Commission
 Scottish Futures Trust
 Scottish National Investment Bank
 Scottish Public Pensions Agency
 VisitScotland

List of Office holders
There have been seven office holders since the establishment of Scottish devolution.

See also
Cabinet (government)
Government Minister
Ministry

References

External links
Scottish Government - Business and Industry
Scottish Government - Economy
Scottish Government - Planning
Scottish Government - Transport

 
Finance
Economy ministers
Transport ministers
Public finance of Scotland